Ovatis simplex is a species of crabs in the family Xanthidae, the only species in the genus Ovatis.

References

Xanthoidea
Monotypic arthropod genera